John Frandsen (born 19 September 1948) is a Danish former professional footballer who played as a midfielder. He played at Glostrup IF 32, Boldklubben Frem, NEC Nijmegen, FC Wageningen, FC Zwolle and Brøndby IF. He capped once for the Denmark national team in a friendly against Norway.

References

External links
BK Frem
VI.nl

Living people
1948 births
People from Glostrup Municipality
Association football midfielders
Danish men's footballers
Brøndby IF players
Boldklubben Frem players
FC Wageningen players
PEC Zwolle players
NEC Nijmegen players
Danish Superliga players
Eredivisie players
Denmark international footballers
Danish expatriate men's footballers
Expatriate footballers in the Netherlands
Danish expatriate sportspeople in the Netherlands
Sportspeople from the Capital Region of Denmark